is a district located in Oshima Subprefecture, Hokkaido, Japan.

As of 2004, the district has an estimated population of 48,470 and a density of 71.18 persons per km2. The total area is 680.95 km2.

Towns
Kikonai
Shiriuchi

Merger
On February 1, 2006, the town of Kamiiso merged with the town of Ōno, from Kameda District, to form the new city of Hokuto.

Districts in Hokkaido